Stargate Universe is a Canadian-American military science fiction television series created by Brad Wright and Robert C. Cooper as a spin off from its sister shows, Stargate SG-1 and Stargate Atlantis.

The show has stand-alone episodes as well as multi-part episodes, and it also has more season-long story and character arcs running through every episode than any other Stargate series. Brad Wright was hopeful that the show would last three or more seasons. On December 16, 2010, Entertainment Weekly reported that the show would end after the second season.

Series overview

Episodes in bold are continuous episodes, where the story spans over 2 or more episodes.

Television series

Season 1 (2009–10) 

The first season consists of 20 episodes. Brad Wright and Robert C. Cooper wrote the three-parter series opener named "Air", which was originally planned to be a two-parter. The first two parts of "Air" premiered on Syfy on October 2, 2009, with regularly weekly airing beginning on October 9, 2009. "Fire" was originally going to be the title for episode four, but the story and script was too big to be able to fit into one episode, so the producers changed it to become a two-parter called "Darkness" and "Light", therefore pushing all future episodes forward one slot. "Justice" was the mid-season finale. The back half of the first season aired on Friday April 2, 2010 on Space and Syfy.

British channel Sky1 acquired the exclusive UK rights to Stargate Universe and began airing the series from October 6, 2009. The series currently airs on Space in Canada. In Australia Stargate Universe commenced airing on free-to-air-TV on Network Ten from 20:30 on Monday 14 December 2009, broadcasting the first two episodes: "Air (Part 1)" and "Air (Part 2)" as a movie-length premiere. However, Network Ten dropped the series after just three weeks. All available episodes were however fast-tracked from the US and broadcast on the Sci Fi Channel on Foxtel screening in Australia only 'days' after the US.

The final episode of Season 1, "Incursion (Part 2)", had World Premiere on the German TV channel "RTL2". RTL2 aired the episode one week ahead of Syfy, in combination with "Incursion (Part1)".

Season 2 (2010–11) 

The second season of Stargate Universe was announced by Syfy on December 13, 2009. Like the first season, the second season consisted of 20 episodes. Nine episodes had already been reserved by the primary series writers. The series was moved from the franchise's usual time on Friday to Tuesday, along with Caprica. This was due to Syfy picking up WWE Friday Night SmackDown. The series resumed on September 28, 2010, USA.  In Ireland & UK the series resumed on October 5 at 9pm on Sky1 and Sky1 HD.  Syfy announced the series cancellation during the mid-season hiatus. Syfy aired the remainder of season two consisting of the final 10 episodes which were all filmed before the series was cancelled. The second half of Season 2 began airing on Mondays as of March 7. In Canada, the second half of Season 2 began airing on Tuesdays as of March 8 at 10pm on the Space Channel.

Webisodes
Stargate Universe Kino

Thirty-four webisodes have also been released to tie into the series. The webisodes use "SG·U Stargate Universe KINO" as their title card. They center on the Kino (described by Mallozzi as an Ancient version of the MALP) following around the crew of the Destiny. The webisodes are available for viewing at the Kino  character profile.

DVD and Blu-ray releases

See also
 List of Stargate SG-1 episodes
 List of Stargate Atlantis episodes

References

General references

External links
  at MGM (Most of site requires Flash)
 
 List of Stargate Universe episodes  at GateWorld

Lists of Canadian television series episodes
Lists of American science fiction television series episodes
Stargate episodes

it:Stargate Universe#Episodi